William Thomson Hay  (6 December 1888 – 18 April 1949) was an English comedian who wrote and acted in a schoolmaster sketch that later transferred to the screen, where he also played other authority figures with comic failings. His film Oh, Mr. Porter! (1937), made by Gainsborough Pictures, is often cited as the supreme British-produced film-comedy, and in 1938 he was the third highest-grossing star in the UK. Many comedians have acknowledged him as a major influence. Hay was also a keen amateur astronomer.

Early life
Hay was born at 23 Durham Street in Stockton-on-Tees, County Durham. He was one of two sons and three daughters of William Robert Hay (1851–1920) and his wife, Elizabeth (1859–1910) (née Ebden). When Will Hay Jr. was less than a year old the family moved to Lowestoft in Suffolk. By his late teens, Hay had become fluent in Italian, French and German and secured employment as an interpreter.

Career

Early career
Hay decided to become an actor when he was 21 after watching W. C. Fields perform a juggling act in Manchester. In the early years of the twentieth century Hay experienced some moderate success as a stand-up comedian and an after-dinner speaker. Hay's first professional job came when he was offered a contract to perform at a theatre in Belper. In 1914 Hay began working with the impresario Fred Karno who had previously helped Stan Laurel and Charlie Chaplin achieve success. He worked with Karno for four years. He first performed his schoolmaster character in 1910 which he based upon a colleague of his sister, who was a teaching mistress. The characterisation was initially performed in drag as a schoolmistress, but he transferred the character to a headmaster.

The acts in which Hay performed the schoolmaster sketch became known as "The Fourth Form at St. Michael's". Hay toured with the act and appeared in the United States, Canada, Australia and South Africa (where he added Afrikaans to his languages). His wife, Gladys, often played a schoolboy or the character Harbottle in his sketches. The Harbottle character was one of the most appreciated in Hay's act, a dim-witted, nearly deaf old man who is still in school because he's so backward. The character later featured in Hay's films portrayed by Moore Marriott. In a 1976 interview, Val Guest, who served as a screenwriter for many of Hay's films, recalled transposing Harbottle from school into other everyday situations. He famously performed the schoolmaster routine at the 1925 Royal Command Performance before King George V and Queen Mary.

Hay published a magazine piece entitled Philosophy of Laughter, in which he discussed the psychology of comedy. In the essay he rhetorically asks, "Why does every one of us laugh at seeing somebody else slapped in the face with a large piece of cold custard pie? Is it because we're all naturally cruel? Or is it because there's something inherently funny in custard pies? Or in faces? Or in throwing things? No, no, and no! The real reason why we laugh is because we are relieved. Because we are released from a sense of fear. Wherever we may happen to be – in the cinema, theatre, or music-hall – we tend to identify with the actors we are watching. So that when a custard pie is thrown we fear for a moment that it has been thrown at us. And then, immediately we realise that it hasn't hit us, we experience a feeling of relief, and we laugh".

From 1934 to 1943, he was a prolific film star in Britain and was ranked the third highest grossing star at the British box office in 1938, behind George Formby and Gracie Fields. He is widely regarded as one of the most prolific and influential British comedians of all time.

Hay worked with Gainsborough Pictures from 1935 to 1940, during which time he developed a partnership with Graham Moffatt, playing an insolent overweight schoolboy, and Moore Marriott as a toothless old man. Hay's 1937 film, with Moffatt and Marriott, Oh, Mr. Porter! was credited by The Times as being "a comic masterpiece of the British cinema", while the writer Jimmy Perry cited the film as an influence on key character development for Dad's Army.

Hay often portrayed incompetent authority figures who attempt to conceal their incompetence but whose true traits are gradually exposed. As well as being incompetent, his characters are often immoral; for example, a clergyman involved in horse betting in Dandy Dick, a fraudster who lies about his career as a distinguished sea captain in Windbag the Sailor, and a prison warden, Dr Benjamin Twist, in Convict 99, who obtains his job under false pretences. He is often compared to W. C. Fields, who typically portrayed characters similar to those of Hay, being misanthropic, self-centered scoundrels who nevertheless remain sympathetic.

Elstree Studios
Hay had become interested in film making while touring in the United States in the 1920s, although, at the time he doubted he had a future in this field. Having returned to Britain, Hay started work at Elstree Studios in 1934 where he made three films, Those Were the Days, Radio Parade of 1935 and Dandy Dick.

Gainsborough Pictures
Hay's work at Gainsborough was his most successful, and source of his reputation as a great comic actor. During this period he became one of the most prolific film stars in Britain. On three occasions, British film exhibitors voted him among the top ten box office stars in an annual poll run by the Motion Picture Herald. He was ranked 8th in 1936, 4th in 1937 and 3rd in 1938.

His first film for the studio was Boys Will Be Boys, whose screenplay was written by Hay himself. The movie's satire on the public school system was loosely based on the Narkover vein of humour in the work of Daily Express columnist, Beachcomber. Hay's film was widely seen as subversive towards authority, and it was granted an 'A' (adult) certificate by the British Board of Film Classification. Boys Will Be Boys is widely regarded as Hay's break-out film. Writing for The Spectator, Graham Greene described the film as "very amusing", and Hay's portrayal of Dr. Smart as "competent", though Green thought Claude Dampier's portrayal of Second Master Finch (Hay's adversary) was the film's "finest performance". Many years later, the Radio Times Guide to Films gave Boys Will Be Boys three stars out of five, observing that the film contains "the blend of bluster and dishonesty that makes his films irresistible".

During his time with Gainsborough Hay worked with Marcel Varnel, Val Guest, Charles Hawtrey, and Marriott Edgar, as well as Moore Marriott and Graham Moffatt, who were Hay's straight men in a number of his films. Moffatt played Albert, the overweight, insolent schoolboy reminiscent of Billy Bunter, while Marriott was the toothless old Harbottle. The trio appeared in six films together between 1936 and 1940, Windbag the Sailor, Oh, Mr. Porter!, Convict 99, Old Bones of the River, Ask a Policeman and Where's That Fire?.

Hay's 1937 film alongside Moffatt and Marriott, Oh, Mr. Porter! is often considered to be one of the greatest British comedy films of all-time. The British Film Institute included the film in its 360 Classic Feature Films list; Variety magazine described the movie as "amusing, if over-long", noting that there was "no love interest to mar the comedy"; and the cult website TV Cream listed it at number 41 in its list of cinema's Top 100 Films. The director Marcel Varnel considered the film as among his best work, and it was described in 2006, by The Times in its obituary for writer Val Guest, as "a comic masterpiece of the British cinema". Jimmy Perry, in his autobiography, wrote that the triumvirate of Captain Mainwaring, Corporal Jones and Private Pike in Dad's Army was inspired by watching Oh, Mr Porter.

Both Moffatt and Marriott were absent from Hay's 1938 film, Hey! Hey! USA with American comedy actor Edgar Kennedy being cast as Hay's sidekick instead; the film was a somewhat unsuccessful attempt to crack the American market. In his Gainsborough films, Hay wore a wig, which made it appear as if he was balding.

Hay decided to break up the partnership with Moffatt and Marriott after their 1940 film Where's That Fire? due to his concern that their act was becoming repetitive. He was known to dislike working with the pair, describing their partnership as "a three legged stool". He had also expressed concern that Moore Marriott, who portrayed Harbottle, received a bigger reaction from audiences than he did. He had been seeking to break up their partnership in previous years, and it was only due to his film Hey! Hey! USA being somewhat unsuccessful that the writers and producers successfully talked him into bringing Moffatt and Marriott back.

Ealing Studios
Hay left Gainsborough and began working with Ealing Studios in 1940, in an attempt to break up his partnership with Moffatt and Marriott.  Claude Hulbert and Charles Hawtrey were Hay's sidekicks in his first film for Ealing, The Ghost of St. Michael's (1941). Both would return to act with Hay in subsequent films - Hawtrey in The Goose Steps Out (1942) and Hulbert in Hay's final film, My Learned Friend (1943). John Mills, who had appeared in Hay's first film, Those Were the Days returned to act as his sidekick in The Black Sheep of Whitehall. The Goose Steps Out (1942) for Ealing was an effective piece of anti-Nazi slapstick. In the film, Hay acts as a British spy posing as a Nazi agent and teaches Nazi students about British customs. When lecturing them on this topic, he tells the students that the V sign (often used in Britain as an insult) is a mark of respect, and instructs the class to make a synchronised V sign to a portrait of Adolf Hitler. This scene is often considered one of the most iconic from a British comedy film.

During Hay's tenure with Ealing he was credited as a director in three of his films, The Black Sheep of Whitehall, The Goose Steps Out and My Learned Friend. In all three, he co-directed with Basil Dearden. In 1942, he starred in a short information film, Go to Blazes alongside Thora Hird and Muriel George. The film was set during the Blitz and his role was a dim-witted father who tried unsuccessfully to defuse a bomb which had landed near his house, the bomb is only defused through the help of his daughter, portrayed by Hird. Also in 1942, he made an appearance in the propaganda film, The Big Blockade among other prolific actors of the time, including Leslie Banks, John Mills and Michael Redgrave.

His final film, My Learned Friend in 1943 has been described as a masterpiece of black comedy and has been cited as paving the way for the future Ealing comedy films Kind Hearts and Coronets (1949) and The Ladykillers (1955). Due to ailing health, My Learned Friend was Hay's final film.

Hay was scheduled to star in another film for Ealing in 1943, Bob's Your Uncle, but his diagnosis of cancer prevented him from proceeding.

Hay's tenure with Ealing was a box office success and his films were critically acclaimed, but have been described as not at the level of his Gainsborough films with Moffatt and Marriott.

Radio career
The half-hour weekly Will Hay Programme began in August 1944, and was broadcast live from the BBC Paris Theatre in Lower Regent Street. With him in his schoolmaster role, were his pupils, Charles Hawtrey playing the cheeky Smart, John Clark as the class swot D'arcy Minor, and Billy Nicholls playing the dumb Beckett. The series lasted for four months and was cancelled, it is said, due to Hay's dispute with the BBC over the quality of the scripts. Just before Christmas, the show went live at the Victoria Palace for six weeks. The sketch was performed one more time at a gathering of variety entertainers at midnight on 4 May 1945 (4 days before VE Day) before the Royal Family and many military notables. This was at a private function at the Life Guards barracks in Windsor. It was not publicised in the newspapers due to security concerns. Hay's character during his radio series was called Dr. Muffin, a name chosen so that the students could mock him with the name "Old Crumpet".

Astronomy
In June 1932 he joined the British Astronomical Association, in November of the same year he became a Fellow of the Royal Astronomical Society. He is noted for having discovered a Great White Spot on the planet Saturn in 1933.

Hay kept his career in astronomy separate from his comedy career and published Through My Telescope under the name of W.T. Hay, using the same title when giving lectures on astronomy. Hay was an advocate for education on astronomy and considered those who had an interest in astronomy "the only men who see life in its true proportion". In a 1933 interview with the Daily Mail he stated "If we were all astronomers, there'd be no more war." He was a friend of William Herbert Steavenson, who would go on to become the President of the Royal Astronomical Society in 1957.

Just before Hay died, a few items of his equipment were donated to the British Astronomical Association.

He also has an asteroid named in his honour - Asteroid 3125 Hay.

Personal life
In 1907 Hay married Gladys Perkins (1889–1982), whom he had known since he was 15, but they legally separated on 18 November 1935. However, they never divorced and Gladys cited the reason for this was that she was a Roman Catholic. They had two daughters and a son: Gladys Elspeth Hay (1909–1979), William Edward Hay (1913–1995) and Joan A. Hay (1917–1975). Following his separation from Gladys in 1935, he was in a long-term relationship with Randi Kopstadt, a native of Norway.

Off-screen, Hay was described as being something of an eccentric, and a very serious and private man, and some thought he may have had a dark side due to his demeanour. Peter Ustinov, who made his film debut in The Goose Steps Out as a straight man to Hay, said in a 1990 interview when asked about working with him "Well, Will Hay wasn't very funny but I found that very few comics are"; he also said "And Will Hay was always wrapped in a blanket at certain hours and had his tea, and we all stopped talking while he was having his tea, and then we went on shooting. I don't remember him saying anything memorable, nothing I could remember at all. He was very funny when you saw him on the screen, but in life all those people are very, very strange."

He was known to be a hypochondriac, and would often complain of illness to his colleagues when working.

Hay was a passionate aviator, and gave flying lessons to Amy Johnson.

In 1946 while on holiday, Hay suffered a stroke which left the right side of his body crippled and also affected his speech. He was told by his doctors that he would in all likelihood only make a partial recovery. Following his stroke, he spent time in South Africa on the advice of his doctors, because of the climate. His health had improved slightly by the following year, when he had plans to become a film producer but, in 1947, his friend Marcel Varnel, who had directed many of Hay's films, died in a car accident, and Hay postponed his plans.

Death
He made his last public appearance on Good Friday (15 April) 1949. Hay died at the age of 60 on 18 April 1949 at his flat in Chelsea, London, three days later following a further stroke. His body was buried in Streatham Park Cemetery in London. Those who were present at Hay's final appearance described him as showing no sign of illness, and said he had discussed his plans for the future.

Influences
Comedians who have cited Hay as an influence include Ken Dodd, Eric Morecambe, Tommy Cooper, Harry Worth, Harry Enfield, Jimmy Perry and David Croft. Ronnie Barker also cited Hay as an influence, and in 1976 hosted a documentary on BBC Radio that discussed Hay's life and career.

Legacy

'The Will Hay Appreciation Society' was founded in 2009 by British artist Tom Marshall and aims to preserve Hay's legacy and bring his work to a new generation of fans. As of June 2019, the organisation has over 4,200 members.  The Will Hay Appreciation Society unveiled a memorial bench to Will Hay, Moore Marriott and Graham Moffatt in October 2018, in Cliddesden, Hampshire, the filming location for 'Buggleskelly' in Oh, Mr. Porter!. The bench was unveiled by Pete Waterman.

The humour of Hay's films has been described as subversive and similar to that of fellow English comedian Frank Randle. His films are often characterised as exhibiting traits of anti-authoritarianism and having a satirical approach towards how authority figures are portrayed. This is notable with Hay himself, who often played an incompetent authority figure who struggled not to be found out, but whose idiocy was discovered by those around him.

In 2009 a biography of Hay by Graham Rinaldi was published with a foreword by Ken Dodd. Hay never published an autobiography during his lifetime; however, when ill in the 1940s, he had begun writing one, entitled I Enjoyed Every Minute. Excerpts from this unpublished autobiography were included in the 2009 book.

Roy Hudd defined Hay as the "supreme master" of sketch comedy.

Filmography

See also

References

External links

Will Hay.Comic Genius 
Astronomical obituary MNRAS 110 (1950) 130 
Will Hay Fan Page including audio files 
Radio files
The Will Hay Appreciation Society

1888 births
1949 deaths
20th-century English comedians
20th-century English male actors
20th-century English non-fiction writers
20th-century British astronomers
English aviators
English male comedians
English stand-up comedians
English male film actors
English male radio actors
English male silent film actors
English male screenwriters
English male non-fiction writers
English film directors
English science writers
English satirists
English theatre directors
English expatriates in South Africa
English expatriates in the United States
English male stage actors
English humorists
British male comedy actors
British sketch comedians
Slapstick comedians
Fellows of the Royal Astronomical Society
Music hall performers
Actors from County Durham
Actors from Stockton-on-Tees
Vaudeville performers
Jugglers
Hypochondriacs
Science activists
Space advocates
Amateur astronomers
Propaganda film directors
Burials at Streatham Park Cemetery
20th-century English screenwriters
20th-century English male writers